The 2010–11 Western Football League season (known as the 2010–11 Toolstation Western Football League for sponsorship reasons) was the 109th in the history of the Western Football League, a football competition in England. Teams were divided into two divisions; the Premier and the First.

The league champions for the first time in their history were Larkhall Athletic. The champions of Division One were newcomers Merthyr Town.

Premier Division
The Premier Division featured two new clubs in a league of 19, reduced from 20 the previous season after Bideford were promoted to the Southern League, and Calne Town and Melksham Town were relegated to the First Division:

Odd Down, runners-up in the First Division.
Wells City, champions of the First Division.

Premier League champions Larkhall Athletic and runners-up Bitton were both ineligible for promotion to the Southern League due to ground grading issues.

Final table

First Division
The First Division featured three new clubs, reduced to 19 teams from 20 the previous season, after Odd Down and Wells City were promoted to the Premier Division, Clevedon United resigned and Minehead Town were relegated. Both the latter two clubs joined the Somerset County Football League.

Calne Town, relegated from the Premier Division.
Melksham Town, relegated from the Premier Division.
Merthyr Town, newly formed after the liquidation of Merthyr Tydfil of the Southern Football League.

Oldland Abbotonians finished second in the First Division, but were refused promotion due to ground grading issues. Bridport took the second promotion place instead. Elmore were accepted into the First Division for 2011–12 despite finishing bottom of the table this season.

Final table

References
 League tables

External links
 Western League Official Site

2010-11
9